Avenues United is a football club from Kingstown, St Vincent and the Grenadines.
They currently play in the NLA Premier League.

History
Originally from Paul's Avenue in Kingstown, Avenues United is one of the oldest football clubs in St. Vincent having roots dating back to 1965. Avenues United won the inaugural Saint Vincent and the Grenadines National Championship now called the NLA Premier League.  Having won the league, Avenues United subsequently qualified alongside System 3 FC for the 2010 CFU Club Championship. At this Championship, they reached the second round eventually losing both of their matches to Walking Boys of Suriname and Joe Public F.C.

Squad

Achievements
NLA Premier League
Champions (4): 2009–10, 2010–11, 2017, 2018.

Performance in CFU competitions
CFU Club Championship: 1 appearance
2010 – Second Round

References

External links
St. Vincent and the Grenadines Football Federation 
Facebook

Association football clubs established in 1974
Football clubs in Saint Vincent and the Grenadines
1974 establishments in Saint Vincent and the Grenadines